Alameda del Valle is a municipality in Spain,  northeast of Madrid.

External links 
town website (Spanish)

References

Municipalities in the Community of Madrid